The England national under-18 rugby union team is the under-18 team of the England national rugby union team in the sport of rugby union.

History
Under-18 became a recognised age-grade in European rugby in 2004. In June 2018, coach John Fletcher and Peter Walton left the backroom staff having joined the U18 set-up since 2008 from Newcastle Falcons.

European Championship
England is, apart from France and Ireland, the only other team in the European Under-18 Rugby Union Championship to have won the championship, having done so in 2005 and 2006. Additionally, the team came second in the 2009 and 2011 editions. The team did not participate in the 2010 edition.

England lost the 2011 final in wet conditions against Ireland, who took out their first title.

Under-19 International Series
Since 2012, England U18s travel to South Africa to compete in the U19 international series in August every year.

2012

2013

2014

2015

2016

2017

Honours
European Under-18 Rugby Union Championship
Champions: 2005, 2006, 2012, 2013, 2014
Runners-up: 2009, 2011

European championship

Positions
The team's final positions in the European championship:

Current squad
On 28 March 2018, head coach John Fletcher named his 26-man squad for the 2018 Six Nations Festival.

References

External links
England Rugby Football Union website
England Under 18 at the Rugby Football Union website

European national under-18 rugby union teams
Rugby union